Kalateh-ye Qasemabad may refer to:
 Kalateh-ye Qasemabad, South Khorasan
 Kalateh-ye Qasemabad, Razavi Khorasan

See also
 Qasemabad (disambiguation)